Ready Ref Sheets is a supplement for fantasy role-playing games published by Judges Guild in 1977.

Contents
Ready Ref Sheets is a supplement of GM's reference tables for such things as encounters of all sorts, character social levels, movement obstacles, wilderness terrain movement rates, magical research times, and resurrection results.

Publication history
Ready Ref Sheets was published by Judges Guild in 1977 as a 56-page book.  Judges Guild published a second edition in 1978.

In 1976, Judges Guild began releasing packages to their early subscribers in the format of a large envelope containing loose leaf sheets and the occasional stapled booklet, starting with their Initial Package (1976) as a plain, unmarked envelope.  Since the Initial Package was labeled "I," Judges Guild continued on from there with "J," then "K," then "L," and so on, as they released new subscription packages on a bimonthly schedule. Installment J: Thunderhold (1976) and Installment K: City State Campaign (1977) were similar to the Initial Package, but somewhat smaller.  Judges Guild later repackaged many of the charts that had appeared in Installments I, J, and K as the Ready Ref Sheets (1977) — making the rest of their early subscription material available in a retail form. A listing of cumulative sales from 1981 shows that Ready Ref Sheets sold over 20,000 units.

Different Worlds Publications later acquired and distributed game products formerly produced by Judges Guild, including the Ready Ref Sheets.

Reception
 Don Turnbull reviewed Ready Ref Sheets for White Dwarf #3. Turnbull commented: "Needless to say, it is very helpful to DM and players alike to have these useful data assembled in compact form and in sufficient copies to go round the same board conveniently."

Ken Rolston reviewed the Different Worlds Publications version of Ready Ref Sheets in The Dragon #133.  Rolston commented that "Here are 56 pages of neat junk. My favorite is the Offensive Locution (verbal melee) rules, providing characters with a means for engaging in 'witticism' and 'repartee.' Another great piece is the Non-Player Character Cutups table, where you roll dice to see what horrendous social gaffe your hirelings have just committed ('This is to be used at judge's discretion, in large crowds, taverns, on the street, etc.'). This supplement contains lots of other wacky and even relatively useful stuff, like the elaborate Crime, Trial, and Punishment rules. Ready Ref Sheets deserves a six-star rating."

Lawrence Schick, in his book Heroic Worlds, commented that it contains "More tables than you can shake a stick at, basically.

References

Judges Guild fantasy role-playing game supplements
Role-playing game supplements introduced in 1977